Hošťalovice is a municipality and village in Chrudim District in the Pardubice Region of the Czech Republic. It has about 100 inhabitants.

Administrative parts
The village of Březinka is an administrative part of Hošťalovice.

References

External links

Villages in Chrudim District